Slim or SLIM may refer to:

Arts and entertainment

Fictional characters
 Slim Goodbody, a fictional character who teaches about anatomy
 Slim, one of the alien antagonists of the 1988 film Killer Klowns from Outer Space
 Slim, the Pixl from Super Paper Mario
 Slim Bankshot, the 13th ghost that Luigi encounters in Luigi's Mansion
 Slim, a character in John Steinbeck's 1937 novel Of Mice and Men
 Slim, a walking stick in the 1998 animated film A Bug's Life

Music
 Slim (band), a musical group from Oakland, California
 Slim (New Zealand band), a rock band
 Slim (singer) (born 1977 as Marvin Scandrick), American R&B singer and lead vocalist of the group 112
 Slim Harpo (1924–1970), American blues musician
 Slim Shady, alter ego of American rapper Eminem
 Slim Thug, American rapper Stayve Jerome Thomas (born 1980)
 Slim Whitman, stage name of American country and western music singer, songwriter and musician Ottis Whitman Jr. (1923–2013)
 Fatboy Slim, stage name of Norman Cook (born 1963), English musician
 Magic Slim, American blues singer and guitarist Morris Holt (1937–2013)

People

 Slim (name), a list of people with either the given name or surname
 Slim (nickname), a list of people
 Slim Pickens (1919–1983), American actor and cowboy Louis Burton Lindley, Jr.
 Slim family, a wealthy family originally from Lebanon

Places
 Slim, M'Sila, Algeria, a town and commune
 Slim, Perak, Malaysia, a town
 Slim, Oklahoma, United States, an unincorporated community

Science and technology
 SLIM, a slitless spectroscopy simulator programme
 SLiM, a desktop-independent graphical login manager
Structures for Lossless Ion Manipulations, a form of ion optics
 SLiM, short linear motif
 SLIM, slang for an amateur radio operator using a callsign without authorization
 Slim, Pixar's RenderMan Studio Shader Tool
SLIM, Internet provider from KPN
SLIM (Software Lifecycle Management), tools based on the Putnam model of software effort estimation
 Smart Lander for Investigating Moon, a planned Japanese space probe

Other uses
 AIDS, often called "slim", especially in Africa, because of the wasting it produces in untreated victims
 Viscount Slim, a title in the Peerage of the United Kingdom
 Slim, a 1934 novel by William Wister Haines
 Slim (film), a 1937 film adaptation of the novel starring Henry Fonda
 Slim School, a defunct school in Malaya, named after Field Marshal Slim
 Slim Devices, an American consumer electronics company

See also
 Slim Jim (disambiguation)
 Slimm (disambiguation)